The 1975 King's Cup finals were held from December 20, 1975, until January 4, 1976, once again in Bangkok. This was the 8th edition of the international football competition. South Korea were set to defend the title they won in 1969, 1970, 1971, 1973 and 1974

The tournaments schedule was changed from previous editions and only featured one group with 6 teams. The winners and runners up entered a final.

Fixtures and results

Group stage

''Indonesia were mainly composed of players from Persib and Persija, were the official representatives of the PSSI (FA of Indonesia)

Final

Winner

References

External links
RSSSF

King's Cup
Kings Cup, 1975
Kings Cup, 1975